Infraspeed is the builder and infrastructure maintenance company of the HSL-Zuid high-speed line in the Netherlands.

History
Infraspeed BV was created in 1999 by a consortium of Fluor Infrastructure (part of Fluor Corporation), Siemens Nederland (subsidiary of Siemens) and Royal BAM Group, in 2000 financial investors Innisfree and Charterhouse Project Equity (after 2002, named HSBC infrastructure Ltd, see HSBC) began to participate in the company, taking a 49% shareholding.

In 2001, the company obtained a PPP contract with the Dutch state to build and maintain a new 100 km high speed line in the Netherlands, running from Amsterdam to the Belgian border. (see HSL-Zuid). The contract included financing, designing, and construction of the line; 5 years, 2001 to 2006, and maintenance of the line; 25 years, 2006 to 2031. The contract excluded operation of the line, and construction of the earthwork for the line. Fluor provided project management for the scheme, Royal BAM Group installed the track system and barriers, Siemens Nederland provided the electrical power supply system (25 kV AC), and signalling system, including ETCS and GSM-R equipment. Financing of the project cost $1.32 billion. The track construction phase was completed by December 2006.

In 2011, Siemens sold its stake in the company to HSBC and Innisfree, resulting in the two companies controlling ~86% of the shares.

See also
NS Hispeed, Fyra; operator and brand name used for the HSL-Zuid line

References

External links
, Infraspeed company website

High-speed rail in the Netherlands
Railway infrastructure companies
Railway companies of the Netherlands